Baccaurea odoratissima is a species of plant in the family Phyllanthaceae. It is endemic to the Philippines.

References

Flora of the Philippines
odoratissima
Vulnerable plants
Taxonomy articles created by Polbot